He Put the Bomp! In the Bomp is a Greg Shaw tribute album released in November 2007 by Bomp Records in the USA and Vivid Sound Corporation in Japan. The album features 23 classic songs covered by different bands having in common the raw approach to rock and roll music Shaw most liked.

Tracks

References

2007 compilation albums
Rock compilation albums
Tribute albums
Bomp! Records albums